Ramiro Tobar (born 1 May 1944) is an Ecuadorian footballer. He played in five matches for the Ecuador national football team from 1973 to 1975. He was also part of Ecuador's squad for the 1975 Copa América tournament.

References

External links
 

1944 births
Living people
Ecuadorian footballers
Ecuador international footballers
Place of birth missing (living people)
Association football defenders
L.D.U. Quito footballers
C.D. Universidad Católica del Ecuador footballers
C.D. Cuenca footballers